John Aung Hla was an eminent Anglican priest in the 20th century.

He was ordained in 1939. He became Archdeacon of Mandalay in 1945 and an Assistant Bishop of Rangoon in 1949. He was consecrated a bishop on Pentecost day (5 June), by George Hubback, Bishop of Calcutta, at St Paul's Cathedral, Calcutta. In 1993 he became the second Archbishop of Burma.

References

20th-century Anglican bishops in Asia
20th-century Anglican archbishops
Anglican bishops of Rangoon
Anglican archbishops of Myanmar